Put It On Me or Put It on Me may refer to:

"Put It on Me" (Ja Rule song)
"Put It on Me" (YoungBoy Never Broke Again song)
"Put It on Me", a 2001 song by Dr. Dre, from the Training Day (soundtrack)